Honeybirds are birds in the genus Prodotiscus of the honeyguide family. They are confined to sub-Saharan Africa.

References - Honeybird - A guide by J Ian L. Gong

Description
They are all drab coloured birds, with grey or grey-green upperparts, and grey to whitish-grey underparts. They are among the smallest members of the honeyguide family. They have slender bills compared to other members of the family.

Habits
Unlike other honeyguides they do not feed on beeswax. They help in the pollination of plants like Strelitzia, Callistemon (bottle brush), Bombax, Butea monosperma and coral trees (see: ornithophily). They parasitise nests of cisticolas, sunbirds and other dome-nesting bird species.

Species
There are three species:

Prodotiscus